Ostler Peak is a  mountain summit located in Summit County, Utah, United States.

Description
Ostler Peak is set within the High Uintas Wilderness on land managed by Uinta-Wasatch-Cache National Forest. It is situated along the crest of the Uinta Mountains which are a subset of the Rocky Mountains, and it ranks as the 37th-highest summit in Utah. Neighbors include Spread Eagle Peak 1.4 mile to the southwest, Hayden Peak four miles west, and line parent Lamotte Peak two miles north-northeast. Precipitation runoff from this mountain drains into the Ostler and Stillwater forks of the Bear River.

Etymology
The landform's toponym was officially adopted in 1932 by the U.S. Board on Geographic Names to remember the late James Rulon "Dick" Ostler (1900–1931), Uinta National Forest ranger in the Grandaddy Lake region of the Uinta Mountains.

Climate
Based on the Köppen climate classification, Ostler Peak is located in a subarctic climate zone with cold snowy winters and mild summers. Tundra climate characterizes the summit and highest slopes.

Gallery

See also
 Geology of the Uinta Mountains
 List of mountains in Utah

References

External links
 Ostler Peak: weather forecast
 Ostler Peak (photo): Flickr

Mountains of Utah
Features of the Uinta Mountains
Mountains of Summit County, Utah
North American 3000 m summits
Wasatch-Cache National Forest